Mendler is the surname of German origin:
Allen Mendler (born 1949), American author and educator 
Bridgit Mendler (born 1992), American actress, singer, and songwriter
Jordan Mendler (born 1985), American professor, computer scientist, and businessman
Markus Mendler (born 1993), German football player 

German-language surnames
Germanic-language surnames
Surnames of German origin